A mother lode is a principal vein or zone of veins of gold or silver ore.

Mother lode or motherlode may also refer to:

Music
 Motherlode (band), a Canadian pop rock group formed in 1969
 Mother Lode (album), 1974, by Loggins and Messina
 Motherlode (James Brown album), 1988
 Motherlode (Sara Hickman album), 2006
 "Motherlode", a song by Howe II on their 1991 album Now Hear This
 "The Mother Lode", a song from Thom Yorke's 2014 album Tomorrow's Modern Boxes

Other uses
 The California Mother Lode, the main gold deposits of the California Gold Rush
 Mother Lode (film), a 1982 adventure film directed by and starring Charlton Heston
 "The Mother Lode", an episode of the TV series Prison Break
 The Motherlode, a climbing area in the Pendergrass-Murray Recreational Preserve of Red River Gorge, Kentucky

See also 
 "The Motherload", a 2014 song by Mastodon
 Super Motherload, a 2013 video game developed by XGen Studios